L'oracolo in Messenia is a 1738 opera by Antonio Vivaldi to a libretto by Apostolo Zeno. The opera was composed for the autumn Venetian carnival season of 1738 after Vivaldi took over the Teatro San Angelo from the impresario who had managed it the year before.

Recording
 L'oracolo in Messenia - Vivica Genaux, Julia Lezhneva, Ann Hallenberg, Romina Basso, Franziska Gottwald, Magnus Staveland, Xavier Sabata, Europa Galante, Fabio Biondi; Virgin Classics, 2CDs 2012.

See also
List of operas by Antonio Vivaldi

References

Operas by Antonio Vivaldi
Operas
1738 operas
Italian-language operas